The 2016 Ollie's Bargain Outlet 200 was the tenth stock car race of the 2016 NASCAR Xfinity Series season, and the 35th iteration of the event. The race was held on Saturday, May 14, 2016, in Dover, Delaware at Dover International Speedway, a 1 mile (1.6 km) permanent oval-shaped racetrack. The race took the scheduled 120 laps to complete, with the first 80 laps being split into two 40-lap heats of 20 cars. Erik Jones, driving for Joe Gibbs Racing, would take the lead early, and dominate most of the race for his fourth career NASCAR Xfinity Series win, and his second of the season. To fill out the podium, Bubba Wallace, driving for Roush Fenway Racing, and Alex Bowman, driving for JR Motorsports, would finish second and third, respectively.

Background 

Dover International Speedway is a race track in Dover, Delaware, United States. The track has hosted at least one NASCAR Cup Series race each year since 1969, including two per year since 1971. In addition to NASCAR, the track also hosted USAC and the Indy Racing League. The track features one layout, a  concrete oval, with 24° banking in the turns and 9° banking on the straights. The speedway is owned and operated by Speedway Motorsports.

The track, nicknamed "The Monster Mile", was built in 1969 by Melvin Joseph of Melvin L. Joseph Construction Company, Inc., with an asphalt surface, but was replaced with concrete in 1995. Six years later in 2001, the track's capacity increased to 135,000 seats, giving the track the largest seating capacity of any sports venue in the mid-Atlantic region. In 2002, the name changed to Dover International Speedway from Dover Downs International Speedway after Dover Downs Gaming and Entertainment split, making Dover Motorsports. From 2007 to 2009, the speedway worked on an improvement project called "The Monster Makeover", which expanded facilities at the track and beautified the track. Depending on configuration, the track's capacity is at 95,500 seats. Its grand total maximum capacity was at 135,000 spectators.

Dash 4 Cash format and eligibility 
In 2016, NASCAR would announce changes to its Dash 4 Cash format. The format would now include heat races to determine qualifiers. Each driver would qualify for heats in knockout qualifying, with odd-position drivers driving in heat No. 1, and even-position drivers competing in heat No. 2. The top two finishers of each heat would compete for the Dash 4 Cash in the main race after the heats.

Entry list 

 (R) denotes rookie driver.
 (i) denotes driver who is ineligible for series driver points.

Practice

First practice 
The first practice session was held on Friday, May 13, at 10:00 am EST. The session would last for 55 minutes.

Final practice 
The final practice session was held on Friday, May 13, at 12:30 pm EST. The session was scheduled to last for 1 hour and 25 minutes, but due to inclement weather, the session would end early.

Heat qualifying 
Qualifying for the two preliminary heat races was held on Saturday, May 14, at 10:45 am EST. Since Dover International Speedway is under 2 miles (3.2 km) in length, the qualifying system was a multi-car system that included three rounds. The first round was 15 minutes, where every driver would be able to set a lap within the 15 minutes. Then, the second round would consist of the fastest 24 cars in Round 1, and drivers would have 10 minutes to set a lap. Round 3 consisted of the fastest 12 drivers from Round 2, and the drivers would have 5 minutes to set a time. Whoever was fastest in Round 3 would win the pole. 

No drivers would fail to qualify.

Full qualifying results

Heat No. 1 results 
Heat No. 1 was held on Saturday, May 14, at 2:00 pm EST. The race took the scheduled 40 laps to complete. Justin Allgaier, driving for JR Motorsports, would pass Erik Jones in the final nine laps to win the heat and the overall pole. Jones would complete the two drivers in the heat eligible for the Dash 4 Cash.

Heat No. 2 results 
Heat No. 2 was held on Saturday, May 14, at approximately 2:50 pm EST. The race took the scheduled 40 laps to complete. Ty Dillon, driving for Richard Childress Racing, would hold off Daniel Suárez in a six lap shootout to win the outside pole. Suárez would complete the two drivers in the heat eligible for the Dash 4 Cash.

Main race lineup

Main race results

Standings after the race 

Drivers' Championship standings

Note: Only the first 12 positions are included for the driver standings.

References 

2016 NASCAR Xfinity Series
NASCAR races at Dover Motor Speedway
May 2016 sports events in the United States
2016 in sports in Delaware